The ShVAK ("Shpitalny-Vladimirov Aviation Large-calibre") was a 20 mm autocannon used by the Soviet Union during World War II. It was designed by Boris Shpitalniy and Semyon Vladimirov and entered production in 1936. ShVAK were installed in many models of Soviet aircraft. The TNSh was a version of the gun produced for light tanks. ShVAK shares the name with its 12.7 mm heavy machine gun predecessor.

Development and production

12.7x108mm ShVAK 
The development of the 12.7 mm ShVAK was in response to a Soviet government decree passed on 9 February 1931, directing domestic manufacturers to produce an aircraft machine gun for the 12.7×108mm cartridge that had been introduced a couple of years prior for the DK machine gun. Tula designer S.V. Vladimirov answered the call by producing basically an enlarged version of the ShKAS, with a 1246 mm long barrel and a total length of 1726 mm. The first prototype was ready for trials on May 28, 1932. The testing process was fairly drawn out, but the 12.7 mm ShVAK was nominally adopted into service in 1934.

Series production officially started in 1935 at the INZ-2 factory in Kovrov, but production soon fell well behind schedule because the ShVAK receiver was fairly complex to manufacture. According to Soviet records, out of the 410 12.7 mm ShVAKs planned for aircraft in 1935, only 86 were completed; for the tank version, 40 had been planned but only 6 were delivered that same year. A 1952 Western intelligence report indicates that only "a few" ShVAKs were produced in the 12.7 mm caliber.

A further problem complicating the adoption of the gun was that the 12.7 mm ShVAK ended up not using the 12.7×108mm rimless cartridge used by the DK machine gun, but rather—because it was an adaptation of the ShKAS mechanism—it required its own rimmed 12.7 mm cases. Production of the rimmed 12.7 mm ammunition ceased in 1939, when it was decided that the Berezin UB was preferable because it could share ammunition with the DShK.

20×99mmR ShVAK 
The 20 mm ShVAK was designed sometime between 1935 and 1936 and series production began in 1936. A few months later, production of the 12.7 mm version ceased. Similarly to its predecessors, the 20 mm ShVAK was a gas-operated gun, belt-fed by disintegrating link ammunition.

Depending on the intended mount, the ShVAKs were marked with "MP" for the tank version (total gun length 2122 mm; weight 44.5 kg), "KP" for the wing-mounted version (1679 mm total length; 40 kg), "TP" for flexible mounts (1726  mm length; 42 kg), and "SP" for synchronized installations.

The "bird-cage" feed system in the 20 mm ShVAK was an improved version of the ShKAS. It could hold 11 rounds and had an even smoother operation. As with the ShKAS, the purpose of the feed cage was to gradually delink the rounds, avoiding any belt lurch. The Berthier-type gas regulator had four holes (of 3.5, 4, 4.5, and 6 mm) allowing for different rates of fire to be selected. The most significant design difference from the ShKAS was that the gas cylinder was moved under the barrel in the ShVAK, giving it a more compact assembly.

The end of the barrel was threaded, and this thread was used to screw on a blast-reduction tube of a length that depended on the installation requirements:

The 1952 Western intelligence report said of the 20 mm ShVAK: "in relation to its power, the gun is very light and extremely compact" and that it "has a range comparable to our M3 cannon, although their short barrel version is 16 pounds lighter". It was however considered "relatively difficult to produce" in American factories, because it was constructed from relatively soft parts (not heat-treated) that were then filed down. This choice of materials was assumed to be motivated by the desire to allow parts to "deform and bend well in advance of fracture" enabling a safer operation at a high rate of fire, but having the tradeoff of shorter overall lifespan of the gun.

Soviet archives indicate the 20-mm ShVAK was produced in large numbers during World War II:
 1942 — 34,601 produced
 1943 — 26,499
 1944 — 25,633
 1945 — 13,433
 1946 — 754

After the war, the ShVAK was supplanted by the Berezin B-20, which offered similar performance but weighed significantly less.

Installations 
Three Polikarpov I-16 aircraft, all produced in January 1939, were armed with the propeller-synchronized version of the 12.7 mm ShVAK; this short series was given the I-16 Type 16 designation. The three fighter planes successfully passed the factory trials and were delivered to the VVS for military trials. The cancelled Yatsenko I-28 was also planned to use the 12.7 mm ShVAK in a synchronized pair, but the few prototypes which flew in the summer of 1939 did so without armament because a synchronizer for their engine had not been developed.

The 20 mm ShVAK was installed in the wings, in the nose, or in a synchronized mounting in the following fighters: Polikarpov I-153P and I-16, Mikoyan-Gurevich MiG-3, Yakovlev Yak-1, Yak-3, Yak-7, and Yak-9, LaGG-3, Lavochkin La-5 and La-7, the Petlyakov Pe-3 night fighter and on Soviet-modified Hawker Hurricane aircraft. It was also installed on the wings of the Tupolev Tu-2 bomber and some ground attack versions of the Petlyakov Pe-2 bomber also had it installed in a fixed mounting. Some early versions of the Ilyushin Il-2 ground attack aircraft also carried it, but superseded in that aircraft by the 23 mm Volkov-Yartsev VYa-23. The flexible-mount ShVAK was used in the Petlyakov Pe-8 and Yermolayev Yer-2 bombers.

The tank version was installed on the T-38 and T-60 light tanks.

Ammunition

ShVAK ammunition consisted of a mix of fragmentation-incendiary and armor-piercing-incendiary rounds.

There were problems with ammunition development as well. There were cases of premature cook-off of the ammunition in the barrel. The problem was first addressed in 1936 by changing the fuse from the MG-3 model to the MG-201 model, but the problem was not eliminated until the introduction of the K-6 fuse in 1938, which reliably prevented projectiles from arming until they were 30 to 50 cm out of the barrel.

See also
Berezin B-20
Volkov-Yartsev VYa-23
Revolver cannon
List of firearms
List of Russian weaponry
List of common World War II weapons

References

 Широкорад А.Б. (2001) История авиационного вооружения Харвест (Shirokorad A.B. (2001) Istorya aviatsionnogo vooruzhenia Harvest. ) (History of aircraft armament)

 Chinn, George M. The Machine Gun, Vol II, Part VII. US Department of the Navy, 1952

External links

 20mm TNSh Tank Gun at battlefield.ru
 THE RUSSIAN AMMUNITION PAGE - 20MM TO 25MM
 http://www.municion.org/20mm/20x99R.htm 

Autocannons of the Soviet Union
Aircraft guns of the Soviet Union
20 mm artillery
KBP Instrument Design Bureau products
Military equipment introduced in the 1930s